Hoggeston is a village and civil parish within Aylesbury Vale district in Buckinghamshire, England. It is in the civil parish of Dunton.

The village name is Anglo-Saxon in origin, and means "Hogg's farm". In the Domesday Book of 1086 it was recorded as Hochestone.

The village was once granted (in 1314) a Royal charter to hold a market once a week, though this has long since been discontinued.

The parish church is dedicated to the Holy Cross. The church, which from the exterior appears all of one period, has a 16th-century weatherboarded bell turret (containing 3 Change ringing Bells and a Sanctus bell) over the north aisle. The origins of the church are 13th century. There are 14th century additions, and some Perpendicular windows of the same era. The stained glass east window was designed by Sir Niniam Comper in 1949. Anciently there was a fair in the village every year on the feast day of the Exaltation of the Holy Cross (commonly called Holyrood Day). The wrought iron gate, made in the 1970s, to the church yard depicts a stag, the crest of the Micklem family, who resided at Maines Hill, a house just outside the confines of the village.

South of the church is Hoggeston Manor house. This Jacobean house is built of brick with a blue brick diapering pattern. The house is symmetrical and among its noticeable features are the giant brick pilasters, on the north and south facades. The interior has a remarkable Jacobean oak staircase with dumbbell-shaped balusters.

References

External links

Hoggeston Village website

Civil parishes in Buckinghamshire
Villages in Buckinghamshire